Alicia Gladden (May 28, 1985 – April 19, 2013) was an American women's basketball player. As a member of ŽKK Partizan, she had won the Women's Adriatic League and national championships in 2012. Gladden had also played in the EuroCup Women for Partizan as well as for the Polish side Energa Toruń and the Romanian club ICIM Arad.

Florida  State statistics

Source

Death
Gladden died in a car accident on April 19, 2013.

References

External links
 Alicia Gladden at WNBA
 Alicia Gladden at fibaeurope.com
 

1985 births
2013 deaths
American women's basketball players
Basketball players from Florida
Florida State Seminoles women's basketball players
People from Orange Park, Florida
Road incident deaths in Florida
Shooting guards
ŽKK Partizan players